Ripps may refer to:

 The Ripps, English rock band
 Ryder Ripps, American conceptual artist
 Ripps Island, an island in the Potomac River in Washington, D.C
 Ribosomally synthesized and post-translationally modified peptides (RiPPs), a class of peptides

See also
 Ripp (disambiguation)